Kim Jung-man (30 October 1954 – 31 December 2022) was a South Korean photographer.

Biography 
Kim first left Korea as a teenager following his father, a government doctor dispatched to Burkina Faso. He later went to Europe to study fine art painting, and became interested in photography while attending École Nationale Supérieure des Arts Décoratifs in France.

In 1979, Kim won the "Best Young Photographer Award" at the Arles International Photography Festival. The same year, he was named one of "Today's 80 Photographers in France," the youngest on the list. He eventually moved back to Korea, and worked in commercial photography in the 1980s and 90s. In 2000, he was selected one of "33 Men of Culture of Korea" by korea.com and awarded Fashion Photographer of the Year.

Korea 
In 2006, Kim Jung Man reoriented his career, devoting himself to artistic experimentation. He wished to explore a Korean and Asian identity, on a thematic as well as technical level, for example by printing photographs on hanji or Korean paper.

Death 
Kim died of pneumonia on 31 December 2022, at the age of 68.

References

External links

1954 births
2022 deaths
South Korean photographers
Film poster artists
People from Cheorwon County
South Korean Buddhists
Deaths from pneumonia in South Korea